The Northern People's Front was a Nigerian political league comprising NEPU and United Middle Belt Congress members.

References
Robin Cohen; Labour and Politics in Nigeria, 1945–71

Defunct political parties in Nigeria